Finland participated in the Eurovision Song Contest 2002 with the song "Addicted to You" written by Maki Kolehmainen, Janina Frostell and Tracy Lipp. The song was performed by Laura. The Finnish broadcaster Yleisradio (Yle) returned to the Eurovision Song Contest after a one-year absence following their relegation from 2001 as one of the bottom six countries in the 2000 contest. Yle organised the national final Euroviisut 2002 in order to select the Finnish entry for the 2002 contest in Tallinn, Estonia. Twelve entries were selected to compete in the national final on 26 January 2002 where votes from six regional juries first selected the top six to advance to a second round. In the second round, votes from the public selected "Addicted to You" performed by Laura as the winner with 70,580 votes.

Finland competed in the Eurovision Song Contest which took place on 25 May 2002. Performing during the show in position 13, Finland placed twentieth out of the 24 participating countries, scoring 24 points.

Background 

Prior to the 2002 contest, Finland had participated in the Eurovision Song Contest thirty-six times since its first entry in 1961. Finland's best result in the contest achieved in 1973 where the song "Tom Tom Tom" performed by Marion Rung placed sixth.

The Finnish national broadcaster, Yleisradio (Yle), broadcasts the event within Finland and organises the selection process for the nation's entry. Yle confirmed their intentions to participate at the 2002 Eurovision Song Contest on 18 May 2001. Finland's entries for the Eurovision Song Contest have been selected through national final competitions that have varied in format over the years. Since 1961, a selection show that was often titled Euroviisukarsinta highlighted that the purpose of the program was to select a song for Eurovision. Along with their participation confirmation, the broadcaster announced that the Finnish entry for the 2002 contest would be selected through the Euroviisut selection show.

Before Eurovision

Euroviisut 2002 
Euroviisut 2002 was the national final that selected Finland's entry for the Eurovision Song Contest 2002. The competition consisted of a final on 26 January 2022, held at the Kaleva Centre in Tampere and hosted by Finnish journalist/presenter Maria Guzenina and Finnish presenter/comedian Simo Frangén. The show was broadcast on Yle TV2 and was watched by 1.28 million viewers in Finland.

Competing entries 
A submission period was opened by Yle which lasted between 6 August 2001 and 9 November 2001. The broadcaster also directly invited record companies to submit entries. 25 entries were shortlisted from the 467 received submissions received and a panel of five experts appointed by Yle ultimately selected twelve entries for the competition from the shortlist. The experts were Maria Guzenina (Finnish presenter and journalist at Radio Aino), Tobias Larsson (Swedish Eurovision expert), Jørgen de Mylius (Danish television and radio presenter), Marko Reikop (Estonian presenter) and Niamh White (Irish producer and director). The competing entries were presented on 29 November 2001.

Final 
The final took place on 26 January 2002 where twelve entries competed and the winner was selected over two rounds of voting. In the first round, the top six from the twelve competing entries qualified to the second round based on the votes of six regional juries. Each jury group distributed their points as follows: 1, 2, 4, 6, 8 and 10 points. In the second round, "Addicted to You" performed by Laura was selected as the winner based on the results from the public vote. 193,085 votes were cast in the superfinal. In addition to the performances of the competing entries, the interval act featured Mestarit and Irish 1980 and 1987 Eurovision winner Johnny Logan.

At Eurovision
According to Eurovision rules, all nations with the exceptions of the bottom six countries in the 2001 contest competed in the final. On 9 November 2001, a special allocation draw was held which determined the running order and Finland was set to perform in position 13, following the entry from Sweden and before the entry from Denmark. Finland finished in twentieth place with 24 points.

The show was televised in Finland on Yle TV2 with commentary in Finnish by Maria Guzenina and Asko Murtomäki as well as on Yle FST with commentary in Swedish. The show was also broadcast via radio with Finnish commentary by Iris Mattila and Tarja Närhi on Yle Radio Suomi and with Swedish commentary on Yle Radio Vega. The Finnish spokesperson, who announced the Finnish votes during the final, was 1962 and 1973 Finnish Eurovision entrant Marion Rung.

Voting 
Below is a breakdown of points awarded to Finland and awarded by Finland in the contest. The nation awarded its 12 points to France in the contest.

References

External links
  Full national final on Yle Elävä Arkisto

2002
Countries in the Eurovision Song Contest 2002
Eurovision
Eurovision